Anastasios Christofileas (born 21 December 1988) is a Greek professional footballer who plays as a centre-back.

References

1988 births
Living people
Football League (Greece) players
Gamma Ethniki players
Aittitos Spata F.C. players
Diagoras F.C. players
Vyzas F.C. players
Kallithea F.C. players
Kalamata F.C. players
Acharnaikos F.C. players
PAS Lamia 1964 players
Ethnikos Piraeus F.C. players
A.E. Kifisia F.C. players
Association football defenders
Footballers from Athens
Greek footballers